Nicaragua competed at the 2000 Summer Olympics in Sydney, Australia.

Athletics

Shooting

Swimming

Taekwondo

Weightlifting 

Men

See also 
Nicaragua at the 1999 Pan American Games

References

Official Olympic Reports
sports-reference

Nations at the 2000 Summer Olympics
2000
Olympics